Hsieh Min-Nan (born 9 August 1940), also known as Tony Hsieh, is a Taiwanese professional golfer.

Hsieh won 11 events on the Japan Golf Tour. He won the 1972 World Cup with teammate Lu Liang-Huan and also won the individual title. He won many other tournaments in Asia and was the Asia Golf Circuit overall champion on three occasions, in 1971, 1975 and 1977.

Professional wins (52)

Japan Golf Tour wins (11)

Japan Golf Tour playoff record (4–6)

Other Japan wins (6)
1968 Kanto Open
1969 Kyushu Tour BS Tournament
1972 Bridgestone Tournament
1974 Okinawa TV Cup
1976 Tochigi Open
1978 Hokuriku International

Asia Golf Circuit wins (5)
1972 Thailand Open, Sobu International Open
1977 Taiwan Open
1978 Hong Kong Open
1982 Philippine Open

Other Taiwan wins (9)
1973 Republic of China PGA Championship
1974 Tamsui Open
1983 Republic Of China PGA Championship, Kaohsiung Open
1984 Phoenix Cup Open
1986 Vuitton Pro Tournament
1988 Tamsui Open
1992 Mercuries Taiwan Masters
1995 Kaohsiung Open

Other wins (2)
1972 World Cup (team with Lu Liang-Huan and individual)
1980 Philippine Masters

Senior wins (19)
1990 Ashitaka Senior Tournament
1991 Maruman Senior Tournament
1992 Phoenix Cup Senior Open
1993 Dai-ichi Life Cup, Noboru Goto Memorial Tokyu Senior Cup, Green Standard Group Cup
1994 Green Standard Group Cup
1995 HTB Senior Classic, Daxi Senior Open
1996 Hongxi Daxi Senior Open
1998 HTB Senior Classic
1999 Guohua Match Play
2000 Japan Grand Senior Tournament
2002 Kanto Pro Grand Senior Championship
2006 Kanto Pro Grand Senior Championship
2008 Kanto Pro Gold Senior Championship, Handa Cup
2009 Handa Cup
2010 Kanto Pro Gold Senior Championship

Team appearances
this list may be incomplete

Amateur
Eisenhower Trophy (representing Taiwan): 1962, 1964 (individual leader)

Professional
World Cup (representing Taiwan): 1970, 1971, 1972 (team winners and individual winner), 1973, 1975, 1977, 1984
Double Diamond International (representing the Rest of the World): 1977
Dynasty Cup (representing Asia): 2003 (non-playing captain, winners), 2005 (non-playing captain, winners)

See also
List of golfers with most Japan Golf Tour wins

References

External links

Hsieh Min-Nan at the Taiwan PGA official site
Hsieh Min-Nan at the Japan PGA official site (in Japanese)

Profile at 2007 Asian Senior Masters site

Taiwanese male golfers
Japan Golf Tour golfers
1940 births
Living people